The Sorceress Betrayed is the first album of European comic book series Thorgal, written by  Belgian writer Jean Van Hamme and drawn by  Polish graphic artist Grzegorz Rosiński. It was first published in 1980 by Le Lombard under the title La Magicienne Trahie. It introduces the characters of Thorgal Aegirsson, Aaricia, Gandalf the Mad, and Slive.

External links
 Official website  

Fantasy comics
Belgian comics titles
Thorgal